Hiram Millet Dow (April 21, 1885 – March 1969) was an American attorney and politician who served as the 10th lieutenant governor of New Mexico from January 1, 1937 to January 1, 1939.

Early life and education 
Down was born in Cotulla, Texas and raised in Seven Rivers, New Mexico. After graduating from the New Mexico Military Institute in 1905, he earned a Bachelor of Laws from the Washington and Lee University School of Law in 1908.

Career 
After graduating from law school, Dow later settled in Roswell, New Mexico, working as a lawyer and serving as the city's mayor. He was also the president of the New Mexico Bar Association and New Mexico Board of Bar Commissioners. Dow was elected lieutenant governor of New Mexico in 1936 and assumed office in 1936. He served for one term under Governor Clyde Tingley.

References 

1885 births
1969 deaths
People from Cotulla, Texas
People from Eddy County, New Mexico
New Mexico lawyers
New Mexico Democrats
New Mexico Military Institute alumni
Washington and Lee University School of Law alumni
People from Roswell, New Mexico
Lieutenant Governors of New Mexico